This Way Up is a 2008 short film directed by Alan Smith and Adam Foulkes. It follows the story of two undertakers trying to deliver a body to a graveyard. It was nominated for the Academy Award for Best Animated Short Film at the 81st Academy Awards, but lost to Japanese film La Maison en Petits Cubes.

References

External links

2008 films
British animated short films
British black comedy films
2000s British films
Animated films without speech